Pseudopontia zambezi is a butterfly in the  family Pieridae. It is found in riverine forests in the southern African highlands in the Democratic Republic of Congo, Zambia and Angola, at elevations over 800 meters above sea level.

References

Butterflies described in 2011
Pieridae